The Erwin Commercial Historic District encompasses a cluster of historic commercial buildings at the center of Erwin, North Carolina.  It includes all of the buildings on the south side of East H Street between South 12th and 13th Streets, all on the east side of South 13th Street between East H and Denim Drive, and one building facing Denim Drive just east of South 13th.  The buildings are mostly one and two-story brick structures, built early in the 20th century, with modest Italianate design elements.  The Denim Drive property is a Modernist gas station built about 1962.

The district was listed on the National Register of Historic Places in 2015.

References

Commercial buildings on the National Register of Historic Places in North Carolina
Historic districts on the National Register of Historic Places in North Carolina
Italianate architecture in North Carolina
Buildings and structures in Harnett County, North Carolina
National Register of Historic Places in Harnett County, North Carolina